6141 Durda, provisional designation  is a stony Hungaria asteroid, classified as slow rotator and Mars-crosser from the innermost region of the asteroid belt, approximately 3.2 kilometers in diameter. It was discovered on 26 December 1992, by Spacewatch at Kitt Peak National Observatory in Arizona, United States.

Classification and orbit 

This Mars-crosser and presumed E-type asteroid is also member of the Hungaria family, which form the innermost dense concentration of asteroids in the Solar System. It orbits the Sun in the inner main-belt at a distance of 1.6–2.1 AU once every 2 years and 5 months (895 days). Its orbit has an eccentricity of 0.14 and an inclination of 16° with respect to the ecliptic. On 22 September 2154, it will pass  from Mars.

Lightcurve 

In October 2009, a rotational lightcurve was obtained from photometric observations by Brian Warner at the Palmer Divide Station in Colorado. Lightcurve analysis gave a rotation period of  hours with a brightness variation of 0.50 magnitude. Durda belongs to the Top 100 slow rotators known to exists.

Diameter 

Based on a magnitude-to-diameter conversion, Durdas generic diameter is between 3 and 7 kilometer for an absolute magnitude of 14.4, and an assumed albedo in the range of 0.05 to 0.25. Since asteroids in the inner main-belt are typically of stony rather than carbonaceous composition, with albedos above 0.20, Durdas diameter can be estimate to measure around 4 kilometers, as the higher its albedo (reflectivity), the lower the body's diameter. The Collaborative Asteroid Lightcurve Link assumes an albedo of 0.30 – a compromise value between 0.4 and 0.2, corresponding to the Hungaria asteroids both as family and orbital group – and calculates a diameter of 3.20 kilometers.

Naming 

This minor planet was named in honor of American planetary scientist Daniel D. Durda, who has researched the generation, evolution, size distribution and fragmentation of minor planets, resulting in the formation of minor-planet moons. He was especially interested in (243) Ida I Dactyl when he was member of the Galileo mission team. Daniel Durda is also a pilot and an artist of astronomical paintings. In 2015, he was awarded the Carl Sagan Medal for "communicating the wonder of planetary science through visual artistry". The approved naming citation was published by the Minor Planet Center on 8 August 1998.

References

External links 
 Carl Sagan Medal for Excellence in Public Communication in Planetary Science
 Lightcurve plot of 6141 Durda, Palmer Divide Observatory, B. D. Warner (2009)
 Asteroid Lightcurve Database (LCDB), query form (info )
 Dictionary of Minor Planet Names, Google books
 Asteroids and comets rotation curves, CdR – Observatoire de Genève, Raoul Behrend
 Discovery Circumstances: Numbered Minor Planets (5001)-(10000) – Minor Planet Center
 
 

 

006141
006141
006141
Named minor planets
006141
19921226